50 Armoured Regiment is an armoured regiment which is part of the Armoured Corps of the Indian Army.

Formation

The regiment was raised on 7 September 1987 by Lt Col A.K. Bhatia at Ahmednagar with the designation of ad hoc Maintenance Group 'A' which was changed in 07 July 1989 to 50 Armoured Regiment The regiment was one of the few armoured regiments to be raised with T-72 tanks.  The first Colonel of the Regiment was Lt Gen A.S. Sandhu.

History
The Regiment has participated in internal security duties during Operation Rakshak. It has also taken part in Operation Vijay and Operation Parakram.

The Regiment with its T-72 tanks took part in the Republic Day parade and Army Day parade in 1996. The Regiment was presented the ‘President’s Standards’ at Mamun Military Station in  Pathankot on 5 November 2014 by General Dalbir Singh, Chief of the Army Staff, on behalf of the President of India, Mr Pranab Mukherjee.

Colors
The colours of the regiment are Red and Green. In the strict martial sense, these colours when seen in unison depict the traditional Verey Light success signal of “Red over Green” which signifies victory in battle. In a generic sense, Red is the traditional cavalry colour signifying supreme sacrifice while Green stands for the basic desire for peace, harmony, and well being of all ranks of the regiment. Seen together, the colours signify the regiment's preparation for the supreme sacrifice when called upon to do so, from a basic stance of peace, harmony and well-being. These colours adorn the flag of the regiment.

Cap badge
The regiment badge was designed by Lt Gen (then Maj) AB Shivane, PVSM, AVSM, VSM, ADC. It symbolises an amalgamation of tradition and modernity. The cavalry heritage is represented by two pennants interposed at the centre with a horseshoe; and modernity is depicted by the hull of a T-72 M1 below the horseshoe. A scroll below this carries the word दिग्विजय (Digvijay), which means triumph in Devanagri script.

The shoulder title consists of the numeral "50" in brass.

Colonels of the regiment
 Lt Gen (Retd) AS Sandhu, PVSM
 Brig (Retd) AK Bhatia
 Maj Gen (Retd) RS Mehta, AVSM, VSM
 Maj Gen (Retd) JS Sidhu, VSM
 Maj Gen (Retd) Deepinder Singh, SM, VSM
 Lt Gen (Retd) SH Kulkarni, AVSM, VSM**
 Lt Gen AB Shivane, PVSM, AVSM, VSM, ADC
 Maj Gen Sandeep Singh- Current Colonel of the Regiment

Commandants
Maintenance Group "A"

 Lt Col (Later Brig (Retd) AK Bhatia)

50 Armoured Regiment

 Col (Later Brig (Retd)) AK Bhatia
 Col (Later Maj Gen (Retd)) RS Mehta, AVSM, VSM
 Col (Later Maj Gen (Retd) JS Sidhu
 Col (Retd) MS Hundal
 Col (Retd) RC Rana
 Col (Now Lt Gen) AB Shivane, PVSM, AVSM, VSM, ADC
 Col (Now Maj Gen) R Edwards
 Col (Retd) RS Bhatia
 Col (Retd) Anil Bhatt
 Col Gaurav Bhatia
 Col Manvendra Singh
 Col Priyank Tripathi
 Col Jitendra Singh
 Col Rajat Sharma
 Col PJ Mane
 Col Ashish Swaroop, SM - Current Commandant

References

Official Regimental History

Armoured and cavalry regiments of the Indian Army from 1947
Military units and formations established in 1989